Väätsa Parish was a rural municipality in central Estonia. It was a part of Järva County. The municipality had a population of 1,479 (as of 1 January 2004) and covered an area of 195.33 km2. The population density was 7.6 inhabitants per km2.

Administrative centre of the municipality was Väätsa small borough. There were also 10 villages in Väätsa Parish: Aasuvälja, Lõõla, Piiumetsa, Reopalu, Roovere, Röa, Saueaugu, Vissuvere, Väljataguse, Ülejõe.

Geography 
The landscape at Väätsa is an area with large cultivated fields and neat woodland in the northern part of the Türi drumlins and in the upper courses of the Lokuta and Reopalu rivers. In the borough of Väätsa, the manor complex and park dating from the early 19th century, the historic commune house from the late 19th century and the skillfully integrated buildings from the collective farm period will attract your attention. In 1970, an extension was attached to the single-storey classicistic main building of the Väätsa manor. The manor's stable has been reconstructed as a guesthouse. The irregularly shaped manor complex is integrated with a park with a moderate range of species, a pond in the southern part and a boundary wall around it. Immediately to the south, west and north of the manor you can see modern buildings. An artificial lake created on the Lokuta River helps make Väätsa borough more impressive. The lake has a varied shoreline and fine detached houses on the western and eastern shores.

References

External links 
 

 
Populated places in Järva County